Australiaena is a genus of lichenized fungi in the family Caliciaceae. This is a monotypic genus, containing the single species Australiaena streimannii. The genus and the species were formally described in 1997 by Mario Matzer, Helmut Mayrhofer and John Elix.

References

Caliciales
Lichen genera
Monotypic Lecanoromycetes genera
Taxa named by John Alan Elix
Taxa named by Helmut Mayrhofer
Taxa described in 1997